Shenzhen Hongling Middle School is a secondary junior and senior high school in Shenzhen. Its campus are located in the Futian District.

Hongling Middle School has around three thousand students. Most of its students come from Shenzhen.

References

External links
 Hongling Middle School
 

1981 establishments in China
Educational institutions established in 1981
High schools in Shenzhen
Futian District